The City of Castle Pines is a home rule municipality located in Douglas County, Colorado, United States. The city population was 11,036 at the 2020 United States Census. Castle Pines is a part of the Denver–Aurora–Lakewood, CO Metropolitan Statistical Area and the Front Range Urban Corridor. The city is located north of the Town of Castle Rock and south of the City of Lone Tree, Colorado.

History
The "City of Castle Pines North" was approved by popular vote on November 6, 2007, and officially incorporated with the first election of municipal officers on February 12, 2008. At the time of incorporation, Castle Pines was Douglas County's first new city since 1995, and Colorado's 271st municipality. The city's stated vision is to "Enhance our community's unique character by ensuring excellent infrastructure, safe neighborhoods, maximum citizen participation and conscientious development that balances open space, residential and commercial uses."

The "City of Castle Pines North" was officially renamed the "City of Castle Pines" by popular vote on November 2, 2010.

The city originally incorporated as a statutory city and on May 14, 2019, residents voted in favor of home rule and now follows the Council-manager government system.

Geography
Castle Pines is located at  (39.471742, -104.894827) at an elevation of 6,368 feet (1,941 m).

The city lies in the Colorado Piedmont on the western edge of the Great Plains. Happy Canyon Creek runs north-northeast through the western part of the city, and Newlin Gulch and its tributary, South Newlin Gulch, run north-northeast and north, respectively, through the eastern part of the city. All three streams are part of the Cherry Creek watershed.

Lying within the Front Range Urban Corridor, the city is part of the greater Denver metropolitan area, and it borders two communities to its south:  Castle Pines Village and Castle Rock, the county seat.

Demographics

As of the 2010 census, there were 10,360 people, 3,493 households, and 2,928 families residing in the city. The racial makeup of the city was 92.6% White, 2.6% Asian, 1.1% African American, 0.2% American Indian, 0.1% Pacific Islander, 1.0% from other races, and 2.3% from two or more races. Hispanics and Latinos of any race were 5.5% of the population.

There were 3,493 households, out of which 50.0% had children under the age of 18 living with them, 76.3% were married couples living together, 2.7% had a male householder with no wife present, 4.9% had a female householder with no husband present, and 16.2% were non-families. 13.0% of all households were made up of individuals, and 2.7% had someone living alone who was 65 years of age or older. The average household size was 2.97, and the average family size was 3.27.

In the city, the population was spread out, with 33.6% under the age of 18, 3.8% from 18 to 24, 24.8% from 25 to 44, 30.2% from 45 to 64, and 7.6% who were 65 years of age or older. The median age was 39.5 years. The gender makeup of the city was 49.7% male and 50.3% female.

Castle Pines is one of the most affluent cities in the United States.  The median income for a household in the city was $137,019, and the median income for a family was $147,473. Males had a median income of $118,235 versus $71,399 for females. The per capita income for the city was $49,702. About 0.9% of families and 1.7% of the population were below the poverty line, including 2.9% of those under age 18 and 0.0% of those age 65 or over.

Economy
As of 2011, 69.5% of the population over the age of 16 was in the labor force. 0.2% was in the armed forces, and 69.4% was in the civilian labor force with 66.8% employed and 2.6% unemployed. The occupational composition of the employed civilian labor force was: 58.3% in management, business, science, and arts; 28.7% in sales and office occupations; 7.6% in service occupations; 4.6% in production, transportation, and material moving; 0.8% in natural resources, construction, and maintenance. The three industries employing the largest percentages of the working civilian labor force were: educational services, health care, and social assistance (17.1%); professional, scientific, and management, and administrative and waste management services (16.7%); and finance and insurance, and real estate and rental and leasing (14.5%).

The median home value in the city was $457,500, the median selected monthly owner cost was $2,654 for housing units with a mortgage and $731 for those without, and the median gross rent was $1,294.

Government
The City of Castle Pines is a home ruled city and follows the Mayor-Council government system. The City receives the majority of its revenue through sales and use tax collections. The City receives a portion of the revenue collected through property taxes, but these dollars are dedicated to fund law enforcement.

The residents of the City of Castle Pines North elected their first city officials on February 12, 2008.

Parks & Recreation
Castle Pines is home to 5 parks and 14 miles of trails that are 8-feet wide and paved to accommodate a variety of recreational activities. Walking, running and bicycling is permitted on trails, however horseback riding and the use of motorized vehicles is prohibited. The Castle Pines North Metropolitan District maintains most trails in Castle Pines.

Castle Pines parks and natural areas include:
 Elk Ridge Park
 Retreat Park
 Coyote Ridge Park
 Daniel's Gate Park
 Daniels Park

Schools
Students residing in Castle Pines are within the Douglas County School District.

Primary Schools:
 Castle Pines Academy
 American Academy
 DCS Montessori
Elementary Schools:
 Buffalo Ridge Elementary
 Timber Trail Elementary
 DCS Montessori
 American Academy
Middle Schools:
 DCS Montessori
 American Academy

Transportation
Castle Pines is located adjacent to Interstate 25.  The city is served by Denver International Airport and nearby Centennial Airport.

See also

Colorado
Bibliography of Colorado
Index of Colorado-related articles
Outline of Colorado
List of counties in Colorado
List of municipalities in Colorado
List of places in Colorado
List of statistical areas in Colorado
Front Range Urban Corridor
North Central Colorado Urban Area
Denver-Aurora, CO Combined Statistical Area
Denver-Aurora-Lakewood, CO Metropolitan Statistical Area

References

External links

City of Castle Pines website
CDOT map of the City of Castle Pines
Castle Pines Chamber of Commerce

Cities in Douglas County, Colorado
Cities in Colorado
Denver metropolitan area
Populated places established in 2007